Out West with the Peppers is a 1940 American Western comedy film. It is the third Five Little Peppers film.

Plot

Cast

 Edith Fellows as Polly Pepper
 Charles Peck as Ben Pepper
 Tommy Bond as Joey Pepper
 Bobby Larson as Davie Pepper
 Dorothy Anne Seese as Phronsie Pepper
 Pierre Watkin as Mr King
 Ronald Sinclair as Jasper
 Dorothy Peterson as Mrs Pepper
 Victor Kilian as Jim Anderson
 Helen Brown as Alice Anderson
 Emory Parnell as Ole
 Walter Soderling as Caleb
 Roger Gray as Tom
 Hal Price as Bill
 Ernie Adams as Oscar
 André Cheron as Frenchman
 Rex Evans as Martin
 Eddie Laughton as Lumberjack
 John Rogers as Ship Steward
 Kathryn Sheldon as Abbie

External links
 

1940 films
1940 comedy films
1940s Western (genre) comedy films
American Western (genre) comedy films
American black-and-white films
1940s English-language films
Columbia Pictures films
Films directed by Charles Barton
1940s American films